Acacia doratoxylon, commonly known as currawang, lancewood, spearwood or coast myall, is a shrub or tree belonging to the genus Acacia and the subgenus Juliflorae that is native to eastern and south eastern Australia.

Description
It has dark greyish brown to black coloured bark on the trunk which is corrugated. The glabrous or appressed-hairy branchlets are angled towards the apices. Like most species of Acacia it has phyllodes rather than true leaves. The green to bright green phyllodes have a narrowly elliptic to more or less linear shape and are straight to slightly curved. It blooms between August to September in northern areas and September to November in southern areas and produces golden flowers.

Taxonomy
The species was first formally described by the botanist Allan Cunningham in 1825 in B. Field's work Geographical Memoirs on New South Wales. It was reclassified by Leslie Pedley in 2003 as Racosperma doratoxylon and transferred back to genus Acacia in 2006. The specific epithet originates from the Greek words doratos meaning  spear and xylon meaning wood in reference to the use of the wood by Indigenous Australian groups including the Koori peoples to manufacture spears from the wood.

Distribution
It is endemic to central parts of New South Wales, the Australian Capital Territory and Victoria.  It is fairly common on the western slopes of the Great Dividing Range and plains of New South Wales and its range extends through the southern tablelands through the Australian Capital Territory and across Ovens Range in Victoria. In New South Wales it is found as far east as Wollemi spreading as far west as the Ivanhoe District and as far north as Brewarrina. It is found on rocky ridges where it is associated with Eucalyptus and Callitris woodland communities and on red sandy plains where it is often part of mallee communities. In Victoria it is considered rare and has a small disjunct distribution in the East Gippsland Uplands and the northern inland slopes in the Barambogie Range close to Beechworth and around Suggan Buggan where it grows on rocky well-drained hillsides and ridges.

Cultivation
The plant is widely available for cultivation in seeds form although seeds need to be scarified or treated with boiling water prior to sowing. It prefers a well-drained and reasonably dry position and is frost tolerant. It is often planted as a good screen plant in its rounded shrub form and makes a suitable hedge or windbreak.

Uses
A. doratoxylon can be used for land rehabilitation and can grow quickly in rocky soils that are prone to erosion and on recharge areas. It is also nitrogen fixing which will increase soil fertility and makes a suitable habitat for native species. It produces pollen prolifically which is a good food source for native moths, butterflies and insects, attracting insectivorous birds. Other birds including native pigeons and parrots consume the seeds. The timber is a good fuel and produces a hot fire. The dark brown wood is dense and very hard and heavy and used to manufacture for furniture. Indigenous Australians used it to make spears. The foliage is used as fodder for stock during times of drought.

See also
List of Acacia species

References

doratoxylon
Flora of New South Wales
Flora of Victoria (Australia)
Plants described in 1825
Taxa named by Allan Cunningham (botanist)